Joseph Hau'oli L. Wong (born February 24, 1976) is a former American football offensive lineman of the National Football League. He was drafted by the Miami Dolphins in the seventh round of the 1999 NFL Draft. He played college football at Brigham Young after transferring from Hawaii.

Wong was also a member of the Philadelphia Eagles and Oakland Raiders.

After his playing career, he became a head coach at his alma mater, Kailua High School, leading them to the 2019 OAI Division I title. His son, Elias, plays football at Hawaii.

His father is Hawaiian and his mother is Portuguese.

References

External links
 BYU Cougars bio
 Joe Wong at JustSportsStats
 Joe Wong at pro-football-reference

1976 births
Living people
Players of American football from Honolulu
American football offensive tackles
American football offensive guards
Hawaii Rainbow Warriors football players
BYU Cougars football players
Miami Dolphins players
Philadelphia Eagles players
Amsterdam Admirals players
Barcelona Dragons players
Oakland Raiders players
Hawaii people of Chinese descent
American sportspeople of Chinese descent
American people of Portuguese descent